John T. Benson (born November 18, 1937) is an American educator and Superintendent of Public Instruction of Wisconsin 1993–2001.

Born in Mauston, Wisconsin, Benson graduated from Luther College 1960 and received his master's degree from University of Minnesota 1963. Benson was director of education for Marshall Public Schools and was assistant supervisor of Public Instruction of Wisconsin.

Notes

People from Mauston, Wisconsin
Luther College (Iowa) alumni
University of Minnesota alumni
Educators from Wisconsin
1937 births
Living people
Superintendents of Public Instruction of Wisconsin